Barrio París-Londres is a barrio located in Santiago, Chile. The neighborhood intersects at Calle Londres and Calle París, located behind the San Francisco Church, in its former orchard. Barrio París-Londres features shops, hostels, hotels and cobble stone streets with renovated mansions, reminiscent of the Latin Quarter in Paris, France. The barrio was developed in 1923 by a group of architects, and consists of only two streets. The building at Calle Londres 38/40 is a former jail and torture facility, used during the Pinochet regime. Tiles in front of the building depict the names of former political prisoners who were held there.

References

Geography of Santiago, Chile
National Monuments of Chile